First Family is a crime fiction novel written by the American writer David Baldacci. This is the fourth installment in the King and Maxwell book series. The book was published on April 21, 2009, by Grand Central Publishing.

Plot
A daring kidnapping turns a children’s birthday party at Camp David, the presidential retreat, into a national security nightmare.
Former Secret Service agents turned private investigators Sean King and Michelle Maxwell don’t want to get involved. But years ago Sean saved the First Lady’s husband, then a senator, from political disaster. Now the president’s wife presses Sean and Michelle into a desperate search to rescue a kidnapped child. With Michelle still battling her own demons, the two are pushed to the limit, with forces aligned on all sides against them-and the line between friend and foe impossible to define…or defend

References

External links
Official website

2009 American novels
Novels by David Baldacci